Statistics of Belgian First Division in the 1951–52 season.

Overview

It was contested by 16 teams, and R.F.C. de Liège won the championship.
As part of the re-organisation of Belgian football for the following season, this division was renamed Division I.

League standings

Results

References

Belgian Pro League seasons
1951–52 in Belgian football
Belgian